Leon Stein (September 18, 1910 in Chicago – May 9, 2002 in Laguna Hills, California) was an American composer and music analyst.

Stein attended DePaul University, where he achieved his MM in 1935 and his Ph.D. in 1949; he studied under Leo Sowerby, Eric DeLamarter, Frederick Stock, and Hans Lange. He taught at DePaul from 1931 to 1978; he was dean of the School of Music there between 1966 and 1976. Stein was also Director of the Graduate Division at De Paul University of Music. College of Jewish Studies, Chicago. He directed a number of Chicago ensembles, including the City Symphony of Chicago.

Stein's compositions were modernist in character; his works for saxophone are his most popular pieces. He also wrote on music, particularly Jewish music. His manuscripts are held in the Richardson Library at DePaul.

He has two sons.

Books
The Racial Thinking of Richard Wagner (1950)
Structure and Style: The Study and Analysis of Musical Forms (1962, 3rd ed. 1979)
Anthology of Musical Forms (1962)

Music
Stage
The Fisherman’s Wife (1954)
Deirdre (1955)
2 early ballets

Orchestral
Violin Concerto (1939)
3 Hassidic Dances (1940–41)
Symphony No. 1 (1940)
Symphony No. 2 (1942)
Triptych on 3 Poems of Walt Whitman (1943)
Symphony No.3 (1950–51)
Rhapsody (1954)
Then Shall the Dust Return (1971)
Symphony No. 4 (1974)
Cello Concerto (1977)
Concerto for clarinet and percussion (1979)

Chamber/solo
Sonata for violin and piano (1932)
String Quartet No. 1 (1933)
Woodwind Quintet (1936)
Invocation and Dance (1938)
Quintet for saxophone and string quartet (1957)
Sextet (1958)
Violin Sonata (1960)
Trio for Three Bb Trumpets (or Bb Clarinets) (1958)
Trio for Saxophone, violin, and piano, (1961)
String Quartet No. 2 (1962)
String Quartet No. 3 (1964)
String Quartet No. 4 (1965)
Sonata for tenor sax and piano (1967)
String Quartet No.5 (1967)
Suite for saxophone quartet (1967)Sonata for Solo Viola (1969)Suite for wind quintet (1970)Brass Quintet (1975)Duo Concertante for viola and cello (1978)Suite for string trio (1980)Three for Nine (1982)
other works for solo instruments and keyboard

VocalLiederkranz of Jewish Folksongs (1936)The Lord Reigneth (1953)
other religious choral works to Hebrew and English texts

References
Margareth Owens, "Leon Stein". The New Grove Dictionary of Music and Musicians'' online.

External links
Interview with Leon Stein, January 16, 1988

1910 births
2002 deaths
20th-century classical composers
American classical composers
American male classical composers
American opera composers
DePaul University alumni
20th-century American composers
20th-century American male musicians